Hugh David Politzer (born August 31, 1949) is an American theoretical physicist and the Richard Chace Tolman Professor of Theoretical Physics at the California Institute of Technology. He shared the 2004 Nobel Prize in Physics with David Gross and Frank Wilczek for their discovery of asymptotic freedom in quantum chromodynamics.

Life and career
Politzer was born in New York City. His parents, Alan and Valerie Politzer, both from Czechoslovakia, immigrated to the U.S. after World War II and were both doctors. His father, Aladár, was ethnic Hungarian-Jewish, born 1910 in Pozsony, Kingdom of Hungary and whose parents were (Moritz Politzer and Roszi Boschan) He graduated from the Bronx High School of Science in 1966, received his bachelor's degree from the University of Michigan in 1969, and his PhD in 1974 from Harvard University, where his graduate advisor was Sidney Coleman.

In his first published article, which appeared in 1973, Politzer described the phenomenon of asymptotic freedom: the closer quarks are to each other, the weaker the strong interaction will be between them. 
When quarks are in extreme proximity, the nuclear force between them is so weak that they behave almost like free particles. This result—independently discovered at around the same time by Gross and Wilczek at Princeton University—was extremely important in the development of quantum chromodynamics. With Thomas Appelquist, Politzer also played a central role in predicting the existence of "charmonium", a subatomic particle formed of a charm quark and a charm antiquark.

Politzer was a junior fellow at the Harvard Society of Fellows from 1974 to 1977 before moving to the California Institute of Technology (Caltech), where he is currently professor of theoretical physics.  In 1989, he appeared in a minor role in the movie Fat Man and Little Boy, as Manhattan Project physicist Robert Serber. The Nobel Prize in Physics 2004 was awarded jointly to David J. Gross, H. David Politzer and Frank Wilczek "for the discovery of asymptotic freedom in the theory of the strong interaction."

Politzer is one of the 20 American recipients of the Nobel Prize in Physics to sign a letter addressed to President George W. Bush in May 2008, urging him to "reverse the damage done to basic science research in the Fiscal Year 2008 Omnibus Appropriations Bill" by requesting additional emergency funding for the Department of Energy’s Office of Science, the National Science Foundation, and the National Institute of Standards and Technology.

Politzer was elected as a member of the American Academy of Arts and Sciences in 2011.

Trivia
Politzer was the lead vocalist in the 1980s for Professor Politzer and the Rho Mesons, which put out their single, "The Simple Harmonic Oscillator".

Politzer's Erdős-Bacon number is 5 – via appearing in Fat Man and Little Boy with Laura Dern (in Novocaine with Kevin Bacon) and publishing once with Sidney Coleman (Erdős number 2).

References

External links
  including the Nobel Lecture on December 8, 2004 The Dilemma of Attribution
 List of papers, from SPIRES
 
 Caltech press release on Politzer winning the Nobel Prize
 

1949 births
Living people
Nobel laureates in Physics
American Nobel laureates
American nuclear physicists
American people of Slovak-Jewish descent
American people of Hungarian-Jewish descent
21st-century American physicists
California Institute of Technology faculty
Harvard University alumni
Jewish American scientists
Jewish physicists
J. J. Sakurai Prize for Theoretical Particle Physics recipients
Harvard Fellows
Particle physicists
The Bronx High School of Science alumni
Theoretical physicists
University of Michigan alumni
Sloan Research Fellows
Scientists from New York City